The 2011–12 East Midlands Counties Football League season was the 4th in the history of East Midlands Counties Football League, a football competition in England.

League

The league featured 17 clubs from the previous season, along with two new clubs:
Blaby & Whetstone Athletic, promoted from the Leicestershire Senior League
Oadby Town, relegated from the Midland Football Alliance

League table

References

External links
 East Midlands Counties Football League official site

2011–12
10